Kingsman: The Secret Service is a 2014 spy action comedy film directed by Matthew Vaughn from a screenplay by Jane Goldman and Vaughn. The first instalment in the Kingsman film series, it is based on the comic book of the same name by Mark Millar and Dave Gibbons.

The film follows Gary "Eggsy" Unwin's (Taron Egerton) recruitment by Harry Hart (Colin Firth) into a secret spy organisation called Kingsman. Eggsy joins a mission, in brutal and comedic fashion, to tackle a global threat from Richmond Valentine (Samuel L. Jackson), a wealthy megalomaniac and eco-terrorist wanting to deal with climate change by wiping out most of humanity. Mark Strong and Michael Caine play supporting roles.

Kingsman: The Secret Service premiered at the Butt-Numb-A-Thon festival on 13 December 2014, and was theatrically released in the United Kingdom on 29 January 2015 and United States on 13 February 2015, by 20th Century Fox. The film received generally positive reviews from critics, who highly praised the stylised action sequences, direction, acting performances, villain, visual style, score and its dark humour, although some scenes were criticised for being too over-the-top. The film grossed over $414 million worldwide, becoming Vaughn's most commercially successful film to date. In 2015, it won the Empire Award for Best British Film.

A sequel, titled Kingsman: The Golden Circle, was released in September 2017, with Vaughn and the main cast returning. A prequel, The King's Man, was theatrically released in the United States on 22 December 2021.

Plot
In 1997, probationary secret agent Lee Unwin sacrifices himself to save his superior, Harry Hart. Blaming himself for Lee's death, Harry returns to London and gives Lee's young son Gary "Eggsy" a medal engraved with an emergency assistance number.

Seventeen years later, Eggsy is a rebellious chav, having dropped out of training for the Royal Marines despite his intelligence and talent for gymnastics and parkour. Arrested for stealing a car, Eggsy calls the emergency number, leading Harry to arrange his release and subdue Eggsy's abusive stepfather's gang. Harry explains that he is a member of Kingsman, a private intelligence service founded by the British elite who lost their heirs in World War I and put their money toward protecting the world; the organisation is named for the tailor shop in Savile Row used as a front for their operations.

Harry, codename "Galahad", nominates Eggsy to replace agent "Lancelot", who was killed by the assassin Gazelle while trying to rescue radical climate change scientist Professor James Arnold from kidnappers. Kingsman's technical support operative "Merlin" discovers Arnold working as though nothing has happened. Hart attempts to interrogate the professor at Imperial College London, but a microchip in Arnold's neck explodes, killing him and putting Harry in a coma. The detonation signal is traced to Gazelle's employer Richmond Valentine, a billionaire philanthropist who has offered everyone in the world SIM cards with free cellular and Internet access. Hart, after recovering from his coma, poses as another philanthropist to meet Valentine.

Eggsy befriends fellow Kingsman trainee Roxy, and he endures Merlin's tests until they are the only candidates left. However, Eggsy refuses his final test — seemingly shooting a Pug puppy he was given to raise — and Roxy is named the new "Lancelot". Harry learns of Valentine's connection to a religious hate group and travels to their church in Kentucky, wearing glasses containing a video transceiver. As Eggsy watches Harry's footage, Valentine triggers the SIM cards inside the church with a signal that causes the parishioners and Harry to become murderously violent. Harry is the only survivor thanks to his fighting abilities, but is shot in the face by Valentine, apparently killing him.

Eggsy returns to Kingsman headquarters and notices Chester King, codename "Arthur" and Kingsman's leader, has the same implantation scar on his neck as Professor Arnold. King reveals Valentine's plan to transmit his violence-inducing signal worldwide, "culling" most of humanity to avert its extinction from global warming. Valentine has recruited various world leaders and wealthy elite to his cause, implanted with chips to protect them from the signal; those who refuse are held captive at his bunker, including Crown Princess Tilde of Sweden. King poisons Eggsy's drink, but Eggsy switches glasses while distracting him, letting King poison himself instead.

Eggsy, Merlin and Roxy locate Valentine's bunker, where many of his conspirators are gathered. Roxy pilots high-altitude balloons to break up Valentine's satellite network, but he secures a replacement. Merlin flies to the bunker, where Eggsy masquerades as King but is discovered by failed Kingsman recruit Charlie Hesketh. Cornered by Valentine's men, Merlin activates the implanted chips' failsafe, killing the guards and conspirators as heads explode around the world. Valentine activates the signal, triggering worldwide pandemonium. Eggsy kills Gazelle and impales Valentine with one of Gazelle's sharpened prosthetic blades, stopping the signal, and shares the sexual encounter Princess Tilde offered him for saving the world.

In a mid-credits scene, Eggsy, now the new "Galahad", offers his mother and baby half-sister a new home and prepares to take on his stepfather and gang, just as Harry once did.

Cast

Hanna Alström appears as Tilde, Crown Princess of Sweden, and Bjørn Floberg appears as Morten Lindström, the Swedish Prime Minister. Lily Travers portrays Lady Sophie. Jonno Davies plays Lee Unwin, Eggsy's father and a former Kingsman candidate who sacrificed himself to save Hart. Nicholas Banks, Nicholas Agnew, Rowan Polonski and Tom Prior portray Digby Barker, Nathaniel, Piers and Hugo Higins, respectively, the other four Kingsman candidates. Fiona Hampton plays Amelia, a Kingsman employee who masquerades as a candidate in order to "die" during the first test. Richard Brake plays the interrogator during the penultimate test, Ralph Ineson appears as the police interviewer after Eggsy's arrest and Corey Johnson appears as a fanatic church leader, and Velibor Topić portrayed the biggest goon in the bar fight scene. Tobias Bakare and Theo Barklem-Biggs play Eggsy's friends Jamal and Ryan. Paintings of uncredited extras are used to represent founder members of the Kingsman organisation, later established in The King's Man (2021) to be named Orlando, Duke of Oxford, Polly, Archie Reid, George V, and Bedivere.

Production

Development
The project originated when Mark Millar and Matthew Vaughn were at a bar discussing spy movies, lamenting that the genre had become too serious over the years and deciding to do "a fun one." To have the time to make the film, Vaughn had to opt out of directing X-Men: Days of Future Past, which he called "a really tough decision". He reasoned that if he did not do it, "somebody else ... [would] wake up and do a fun spy movie. Then I would have written a bloody screenplay that no one would want to make."

Casting
Colin Firth joined the cast to lead the film on 29 April 2013. It was initially reported in 2013 that Leonardo DiCaprio was in talks to play a villain, although Vaughn himself later denied that he was ever considered, stating that he came as close to playing the role "as I am to becoming the Pope." Instead the role of the villain went to Samuel L. Jackson. Jackson took the role in part because of a career-long dream to be in a James Bond movie. As he felt that this was unlikely to come true, he took on the role, stating "I felt like this was an opportunity to play a really great Bond villain." Jackson's character has a notable lisp, which was partially inspired by the stutter he had during his childhood. In September 2013, Vaughn cast Sophie Cookson for the female lead, preferring a newcomer over more obvious candidates like Emma Watson and Bella Heathcote. Mark Hamill was cast as Professor James Arnold, a reference to his character in the source comic book being named "Mark Hamill".

Filming
Principal photography began 6 October 2013 in Deepcut, Surrey, on a budget reported to be one-third of the $200 million budget of Skyfall. The Alexandra Road Estate in Camden was used for Eggsy's home area, and some scenes were filmed at Imperial College London. The Black Prince Pub in Kennington, South London, was used for various fight scenes and the car chase. Savile Row in Mayfair was also employed as a location and the exterior of tailors Huntsman at No. 11, which provided the clothes, and James Lock & Co. in St James's, which provided the hats.

Music

In May 2014, it was reported that Henry Jackman and Matthew Margeson would be composing the music for the film, while in July it was announced that Gary Barlow would be writing the music for the film. Additionally, a song from Take That's seventh studio album III, "Get Ready for It", played during the end credits.

Release
The film's premiere was held in London on 14 January 2015, with director Vaughn and stars Firth, Egerton and Strong attending; Take That performed the film's theme live. A regional premiere was held in Glasgow at exactly the same time as the London event, and live footage was streamed from the premiere to Glasgow. Mark Millar also hosted a charity screening of the film ahead of its release in Glasgow to raise money for his old school, St. Bartholomews. The film opened in the United Kingdom on 29 January 2015. In the United States 20th Century Fox planned to release the film on 14 November 2014, but later delayed it to 6 March 2015. It was later moved up to 24 October 2014, before being delayed again to 13 February 2015. The film was released in most of Latin America and Indonesia, with the action scene set in the church removed. The scene, considered vital by the director and film critics, was excised almost completely, leaving only the set-up and immediate consequences.

Marketing
The trade paperback collecting the comics miniseries was released on 14 January 2015. Vaughn teamed up with luxury retailer Mr Porter to create a 60-piece clothing line based on the film. Mr Porter worked with the film's costume designer, Arianne Phillips, to design the bespoke suiting, while everything from the ties and shirts to eyewear, umbrellas, shoes and watches were designed by heritage brands such as Cutler and Gross, George Cleverley and Mackintosh. The collaboration is the first of its kind, making Kingsman: The Secret Service the first film from which customers can buy all of the outfits they see. The film also includes significant product placement for Adidas Originals.

Originally the marketing campaign was going to begin with a teaser trailer featuring all six actors who portrayed James Bond—Sean Connery, George Lazenby, Roger Moore, Timothy Dalton, Pierce Brosnan, and Daniel Craig—discussing the need for a new generation of secret agents before Harry and Eggsy entered the room, symbolizing the passing of the torch to a new franchise of spy films. Almost all of the actors agreed to appear and Vaughan agreed to shoot the scene, but the plans were shelved because Connery was too ill with dementia by that time.

Home media
The film was released on digital HD on 15 May 2015 and on Blu-ray and DVD on 9 June. It was released on 4K UHD Blu-ray on 1 March 2016.

Reception

Box office
Kingsman: The Secret Service grossed $414.4 million worldwide; $24.2 million of the takings were generated from the UK market and $128.3 million from North America.

Kingsman opened on 30 January 2015 in the UK, Sweden, Ireland and Malta. In the UK the film opened with $6.5 million and debuted at second place (behind Big Hero 6). The following weekend it opened in two additional countries: Australia and New Zealand. It debuted atop the box office in both countries and had a successful opening in Australia with $3.6 million. In its third weekend, it earned $23 million from 4,844 screens in 39 countries. It topped the box office in three countries; Singapore, Hong Kong and Thailand, the rest of which were dominated by Fifty Shades of Grey. In its fourth weekend, it expanded to a total of 54 countries and grossed $33.4 million from 5,940 screens. Its biggest opener outside of North America was in China where it earned $27.9 million. Other high openings occurred in South Korea ($5.3 million) Russia and the CIS ($3.6 million), Taiwan ($3.4 million), and France ($3.3 million).

In the United States and Canada, the film opened on 13 February and was predicted to debut to around $28 million. The film opened in 3,204 cinemas and grossed $10.4 million on its first day, $15.4 million on its second day and $10.4 million on its third day, for a weekend gross of $36.2 million (an $11,300-per-cinema average), finishing second at the box office behind Fifty Shades of Grey. During the four-day Presidents Day weekend it grossed $41.8 million.

Critical response
The review aggregator website Rotten Tomatoes sampled 264 critics and judged 75% of the reviews positive, with an average rating of 6.8/10. The website's critical consensus reads "Stylish, subversive, and above all fun, Kingsman: The Secret Service finds director Matthew Vaughn sending up the spy genre with gleeful abandon". On Metacritic, the film has a weighted average score of 60 out of 100, based on 50 critics, indicating "mixed or average reviews". The Movie Review Query Engine (MRQE) rates the film at 63 out of 100, based on 108 film critic reviews. Audiences polled by CinemaScore, gave the film a grade of "B+" on an A+ to F scale.

Peter Travers of Rolling Stone said of the film, "This slam-bang action movie about British secret agents is deliriously shaken, not stirred ... Even when it stops making sense, Kingsman is unstoppable fun". Jordan Hoffman, writing for The Guardian, said of the film, "The spirit of 007 is all over this movie, but Vaughn's script ... has a licence to poke fun. ... no one involved in the production can believe they're getting away with making such a batshit Bond." Comparing the film to those of Christopher Nolan, Hoffman said, "Despite the presence of grandfatherly Michael Caine, Kingsman's tone is about as far from the Christopher Nolan-style superhero film as you can get. Verisimilitude is frequently traded in for a rich laugh". Peter Bradshaw, writing for The Guardian, called the film "a smirking spy spoof, weirdly charmless and dated in unintentional ways", commenting that "it is a film forever demanding to be congratulated on how "stylish" it is."

Some reviewers were critical of the film's depiction of violence, which was considered to be too graphic for a comedy. Anthony Lane of The New Yorker stated, "Few recent movies have fetched quite as far as 'Kingsman', and countless viewers will relish the brazen zest of its invention." However, Lane was critical of the film's use of stereotypes. Manohla Dargis of The New York Times enjoyed the film, but criticised Vaughn's use of violence as a cinematic tool, calling it "narrative overkill". Jason Ward of The Guardian wrote that "[e]verything about Kingsman exists to disguise the fact that it is solidly conservative". His examples include "[t]he depiction of Valentine's plan as a throwback to a less serious era of spy movies [which] is revealed as a feint, with the ulterior motive of undermining environmentalists". Likewise, The A.V. Clubs Ignatiy Vishnevetsky commented that, "Far from being a Team America-style send-up of gentleman spy movies, Kingsman is actually even more reactionary than the movies it's referencing; it traffics in the kind of Tory values Bond flicks merely suggest ... the thing is, the movie is fun, at least from a visual design standpoint, even though it's hard to separate its bespoke fashions, future-vintage gadgets, and aristocratic décor from its fusty worldview". Peter Sobczynski of RogerEbert.com, who gave the film two out of four stars, likened Vaughn's script to the spy film equivalent of Scream and also criticised the overuse of graphic violence, despite its cartoonish rendering.

Accolades

Sequels 

Millar and Vaughn stated that a sequel was possible if the film performs well at the box office, and Vaughn expressed interest in directing the sequel. Vaughn also noted that he hoped to have Firth back in the sequel, and that Strong was interested in returning as well. It was confirmed that Taron Egerton was contracted for the sequel. When asked how they would incorporate Firth's character into the sequel, Millar stated that various ideas have been discussed, including giving Harry Hart an evil brother, or perhaps turning the character into a ghost. Fox announced a sequel was in the works, but it was unclear if Vaughn would return to direct. On 11 June 2015, it was confirmed Vaughn had begun writing the sequel, and that he might return to direct it. Principal photography was set to begin in April 2016, with a 6 October 2017 release date. It was reported that Julianne Moore was in talks to star as the new villain, and Halle Berry might sign on as the Head of the CIA. On 18 March 2016, Edward Holcroft was also confirmed to reprise his role as Charles "Charlie" Hesketh.

Vaughn later revealed the sequel's title to be Kingsman: The Golden Circle. The plot follows Eggsy and Merlin joining forces with "Statesman", their American counterpart after Kingsman was destroyed by the film's villain Poppy, played by Moore. On 7 April 2016, Egerton revealed the first poster for the film, which strongly hinted that Firth would return for the film, as it featured Harry Hart's trademark pair of glasses with one of the lenses missing below the tagline (a borrowed quote from Mark Twain) stating "reports of my death have been greatly exaggerated." Sophie Cookson also reprised her role as Roxy Morton in the sequel. On 12 April 2016, Elton John was in talks about joining the cast of the upcoming sequel. John would not be playing a character, but having screen time as himself.

Notes

References

External links

 
 
 
 

20th Century Fox films
TSG Entertainment films
2014 films
2014 action comedy films
2010s adventure comedy films
2010s coming-of-age films
2010s spy comedy films
American spy action films
American action comedy films
American coming-of-age films
American spy films
Apocalypticism in fiction
British action comedy films
British coming-of-age films
British spy films
Eco-terrorism in fiction
2010s English-language films
Fictional intelligence agencies
Films about security and surveillance
Films about terrorism
Films based on American comics
Films directed by Matthew Vaughn
Films produced by Matthew Vaughn
Films scored by Henry Jackman
Films scored by Matthew Margeson
Films set in 1997
Films set in 2014
Films set in Argentina
Films set in England
Films set in Hertfordshire
Films set in Kentucky
Films set in London
Films set in the Middle East
Films set in Rio de Janeiro (city)
Films set in South America
Films set in the United States
Films set in Washington, D.C.
Films shot in Argentina
Films shot in England
Films shot in Hertfordshire
Films shot in Kentucky
Films shot in London
Films shot in Rio de Janeiro (city)
Films shot in South America
Films shot in Surrey
Films shot in the United States
Films shot in Toronto
Films with screenplays by Jane Goldman
Films with screenplays by Matthew Vaughn
IMAX films
Kingsman (franchise) films
Live-action films based on comics
Prosthetics in fiction
Shangri-La Entertainment films
Films about mind control
Films shot at Pinewood Studios
2010s American films